Gianluca Farina (born 15 December 1962) is an Italian competition rower and Olympic champion.

He received a gold medal in quadruple sculls at the 1988 Summer Olympics in Seoul, together with Agostino Abbagnale, Davide Tizzano, and Piero Poli.

He received a bronze medal in quadruple sculls at the 1992 Summer Olympics in Barcelona.

References

1962 births
Living people
Italian male rowers
Olympic rowers of Italy
Olympic gold medalists for Italy
Rowers at the 1988 Summer Olympics
Rowers at the 1992 Summer Olympics
Olympic medalists in rowing
Medalists at the 1992 Summer Olympics
Medalists at the 1988 Summer Olympics
Olympic bronze medalists for Italy
World Rowing Championships medalists for Italy
Sportspeople from the Province of Cremona
People from Casalmaggiore